Dirty Little Secrets: music to STRIP by... is the first remix album by industrial music group My Life With The Thrill Kill Kult. The album is a collection of remixes, b-sides, and previously unreleased tracks reminiscent of their sound from the era of Sexplosion! and Hit & Run Holiday.

Track listing

Personnel
Buzz McCoy
Groovie Mann
Lydia Lunch

References

1999 remix albums
My Life with the Thrill Kill Kult albums
Industrial remix albums